Evelyn Ampuero (born ) is a Peruvian female volleyball player. She was part of the Peru women's national volleyball team.

She won the gold medal at the 2005 Bolivarian Games. She participated in the 2006 FIVB Volleyball Women's World Championship.

References

External links
 
 

1987 births
Living people
Peruvian women's volleyball players
Place of birth missing (living people)
21st-century Peruvian women